DT Tammar (2601) was a coastal tug operated by the Royal Australian Navy (RAN) until 1998. She was constructed by the Australian Ship Building Industries, Western Australia.

Tammar is now operated by Defence Maritime Services.

Notes

References
 

1984 ships
Tugboats of the Royal Australian Navy
Ships built in Western Australia